The Guilt Trip is the debut triple album by composer and producer Kramer. It was released in 1992 by Shimmy Disc.

The album's cover is a parody of George Harrison’s All Things Must Pass.

Track listing

Personnel 
Adapted from The Guilt Trip liner notes.

Musicians
 Samm Bennett – percussion
 Randolph A. Hudson III – guitar
 Kramer – vocals, instruments, engineering, production
 David Licht – drums percussion

Production and additional personnel
 DAM – design
 Michael Macioce – photography

Release history

References

External links 
 

1992 albums
Albums produced by Kramer (musician)
Kramer (musician) albums
Shimmy Disc albums